Ithu Manushyano is a 1973 Indian Malayalam film, directed and produced by Thomas Berly. The film stars Sheela, KPAC Lalitha, Adoor Bhasi and K. P. Ummer in the lead roles. The film had musical score by M. K. Arjunan.

Cast
Sheela
KPAC Lalitha
Adoor Bhasi
K. P. Ummer
Sarojam
Supriya (Fatafat Jayalaxmi)

Soundtrack
The music was composed by M. K. Arjunan and the lyrics were written by Sreekumaran Thampi.

References

External links
 

1973 films
1970s Malayalam-language films